Leucobacter komagatae is an aerobic, gram-positive, non-sporulating rod-shaped species of bacteria.

References

Further reading

External links
LPSN
Type strain of Leucobacter komagatae at BacDive -  the Bacterial Diversity Metadatabase

Microbacteriaceae
Bacteria described in 1996